Tyler Township is an inactive township in Hickory County, in the U.S. state of Missouri.

Tyler Township was established in 1845, taking its name from President John Tyler.

References

Townships in Missouri
Townships in Hickory County, Missouri